William Campbell Langfitt (10 August 1860 – 20 April 1934) was a major general in the United States Army. He was prominent as the chief of staff and chief engineer for the American Expeditionary Forces in World War I.

Early life
Langfitt was born in Wellsburg, Virginia (now West Virginia). He attended Ohio State University, where he was a member of Phi Kappa Psi fraternity, and graduated from the United States Military Academy (USMA) at West Point, New York, in 1883, ranked second in his class. Several of his fellow classmates would go on to become general officers in their careers, such as Chase Wilmot Kennedy, George H. Cameron, Harry Clay Hale, George Windle Read, John William Heard, Ira Allen Haynes, Samson L. Faison, Omar Bundy, Robert D. Walsh, Lawrence Tyson, Charles Gould Morton, Tyree R. Rivers, John Wilson Ruckman, Isaac Littell and Clarence Ransom Edwards.

Assigned to the Engineer branch, Langfitt completed the Engineer School of Application at Fort Totten in 1885. From 1886 to 1888 Langfitt was on the staff of the Department of the Columbia. From 1888 to 1893 he served at the Port of Galveston, where he planned and oversaw completion of river and harbor improvement projects.

From 1893 to 1895, Langfitt worked on projects to improve navigation on the Ohio River. Langfitt was an instructor at the Engineer School from 1895 to 1898.

Spanish–American War
During the Spanish–American War, Langfitt was promoted to major with the 2nd United States Volunteer Engineer Regiment, and served in the Hawaiian Islands.

After the war, Langfitt was assigned as an engineer officer with the Army's 13th Lighthouse District (Alaska and Washington), responsible to plan and supervise maintenance and construction of lighthouses and other port facilities.

Post-war
Langfitt was commander of the Engineer School and Depot in Washington, D.C., from 1905 to 1906. In 1906 and 1907 he was chief engineer for Army forces occupying Cuba, after which he resumed command of the Engineer School until 1910.

From 1910 to 1914, Langfitt was responsible for river and harbor improvements in the Washington, D.C., area, as well as improvements to municipal water supply. From 1914 to 1916, he was chief engineer of the Southern Department, responsible for improving rivers and harbors in and around Savannah, Georgia.

World War I
In May, 1917, Langfitt organized the 13th Engineer Regiment as part of an expansion of the Army in preparation for World War I. He commanded the regiment until August, when he was promoted to brigadier general and joined the American Expeditionary Forces as chief of staff. From October, 1917 to May, 1918, Langfitt commanded all U.S. forces in Europe as they prepared for the arrival of the bulk of the A.E.F. In December 1917, Langfitt was promoted to major general.

From March 1918 until the end of the war, Langfitt was the A.E.F's chief engineer, which gave him command of the organization's utilities and transportation, including the Departments of Construction, Forestry, Light Railways, and Roads and Motor Transportation. He participated in all the major battles, including the first Battle of Cambrai, the Somme Defensive, and the St. Mihiel and Meuse-Argonne Offensives.

Post–World War I
Following World War I Langfitt returned to the United States, where he reverted to the permanent rank of colonel and served as district engineer in New York and Puerto Rico until retiring in 1922.

Retirement and death
In retirement, Langfitt resided in Geneva, New York. He died in Washington, D.C. on April 20, 1934. He was buried at Arlington National Cemetery, Section 7, Grave 10091.

Awards
Langfitt's awards and decorations included: the Army Distinguished Service Medal; Companion of the Order of the Bath (Great Britain); Commander of the Legion of Honor (France); and Commander of the Order of the Crown (Belgium). The citation for his Army DSM reads:

Legacy
The , a United States Navy transport ship, was commissioned on September 30, 1944. It continued to be used as a transport ship until 1969, when it was sold to a private company and overhauled for civilian service. The Langfitt transported containerized cargo as the SS Transindiana until being scrapped in 1983.

References

External links

"Valor awards for William Campbell Langfitt" on valor.militarytimes.com

1860 births
1934 deaths
United States Army Corps of Engineers personnel
People from Wellsburg, West Virginia
Military personnel from West Virginia
United States Military Academy alumni
American military personnel of the Spanish–American War
United States Army generals of World War I
United States Army generals
Recipients of the Distinguished Service Medal (US Army)
Companions of the Order of the Bath
Commandeurs of the Légion d'honneur
Commanders of the Order of the Crown (Belgium)
Burials at Arlington National Cemetery